The 2015 Cal Poly Mustangs football team represented California Polytechnic State University in the 2015 NCAA Division I FCS football season. The Mustangs were led by seventh-year head coach Tim Walsh and played their home games at Alex G. Spanos Stadium. They were members of the Big Sky Conference. They finished the season 4–7, 3–5 in Big Sky play to finish in a three-way tie for eighth place.

Schedule

Despite also being a member of the Big Sky Conference, the game with Montana on September 5 is considered a non conference game.

Coaching staff

Game summaries

at Montana

at Arizona State

Northern Iowa

at Montana State

Idaho State

at Eastern Washington

Portland State

at Southern Utah

Sacramento State

at UC Davis

North Dakota

Ranking movements

References

Cal Poly
Cal Poly Mustangs football seasons
Cal Poly Mustangs football